Spinibarbus babeensis is a species of cyprinid of the subfamily Spinibarbinae. It inhabits Vietnam. It is considered harmless to humans and is classified as "data deficient" on the IUCN Red List.

References

babeensis
Cyprinid fish of Asia
Fish of Vietnam
Endemic fauna of Vietnam
Fish described in 2001